Julius Gregory (4 July 1881 – 20 July 1916) was an English professional footballer who played in the Football League for Bury and Manchester City as a full back.

Personal life 
Gregory attended Manchester Grammar School. In late 1914, a matter of months after the outbreak of the First World War, he enlisted in as a private in the 20th (Service) Battalion, Royal Fusiliers. Gregory was killed during an attack on High Wood during the Battle of the Somme on 20 July 1916 and was commemorated on the Thiepval Memorial.

Career statistics

References

1881 births
1916 deaths
People from Romiley
English footballers
English Football League players
Military personnel from Manchester
Association football fullbacks
Bury F.C. players
British Army personnel of World War I
Royal Fusiliers soldiers
British military personnel killed in the Battle of the Somme
Southern Football League players
Manchester City F.C. players
Brighton & Hove Albion F.C. players
Luton Town F.C. players
People educated at Manchester Grammar School